Laura Valverde Moreira (born 2 June 2003), known as Laura Valverde or simply Laura, is a Brazilian footballer who plays as a midfielder for Santos.

Club career
Born in Angra dos Reis, Rio de Janeiro, Laura was a Santos youth graduate. She made her first team debut on 27 September 2020, coming on as a late substitute for Luaninha in a 6–0 Campeonato Brasileiro Série A1 home routing of Ponte Preta.

Laura scored her first senior goal on 18 August 2021, netting his team's second in a 4–0 home success over Nacional-SP, for the Campeonato Paulista championship. On 10 December, she renewed her contract with the club.

Honours
Santos
: 2020

International
Brazil U20
South American Under-20 Women's Football Championship: 2022

References

2003 births
Living people
People from Angra dos Reis
Brazilian women's footballers
Women's association football midfielders
Campeonato Brasileiro de Futebol Feminino Série A1 players
Santos FC (women) players
Sportspeople from Rio de Janeiro (state)